Rear Admiral Simon Moore CB (born 25 September 1946) is a retired Royal Navy officer and a former 'Assistant Chief of Defence Staff for Operations'. He was educated at Brentwood School in Essex.

He is an ex Chair of Governors at Hurstpierpoint College, a Vice President of the Maritime Volunteer Service and a Charity Trustee of The British Youth Opera.

References

External links
Select Committee on Defence
CB (Order of Bath) Award List

1946 births
Living people
People educated at Brentwood School, Essex
Royal Navy rear admirals
Companions of the Order of the Bath